Teojomulco Chatino is an extinct Oto-Manguean language, the most divergent of the Chatino languages, formerly spoken in the town of Teojomulco. Belmar (1902) has the only extant data on the language, a wordlist of 228 words and phrases. It is possible that the speakers who supplied the wordlist were the last speakers of the language, since there were no speakers left by the middle of the 20th century.

Phonology 
The following phonemes are based on reconstructions from available data and comparisons with related languages.

Vowels 
Current reconstructions of Teojomulco Chatino show it had 5 vowels: /a, e, i, o, u/.

Consonants 
Reconstructions show that Teojomulco Chatino had 15 consonants.

Teojomulco Chatino has 7 allophones. /t͡s/ is a post-tonic allophone of /s/, and /kʲ/ is an allophone of /k/ in palatalized environments. /gʲ/ occurs in environments that trigger both palatalization and voicing.

References

Chatino languages